The 2021–22 Serie B (known as the Serie BKT for sponsorship reasons) was the 90th season of the Serie B since its establishment in 1929.

Changes
The following teams have changed division since the 2020–21 season:

To Serie B
Relegated from Serie A
 Benevento
 Crotone
 Parma

Promoted from Serie C
 Como (Group A)
 Perugia (Group B)
 Ternana (Group C)
 Alessandria (play-off winners)

From Serie B
Promoted to Serie A
 Empoli
 Salernitana
 Venezia

Relegated to Serie C
 Chievo (excluded)
 Reggiana
 Pescara
 Virtus Entella

Teams

Stadiums and locations

Number of teams by regions

Personnel and kits

Managerial changes

League table

Positions by round
The table lists the positions of teams after each week of matches. In order to preserve chronological evolvements, any postponed matches are not included to the round at which they were originally scheduled, but added to the full round they were played immediately afterwards.

Results

Promotion play-offs
Rules:
 Preliminary round: the higher-placed team plays at home. If teams are tied after regular time, extra-time is played. If scores are still level, the higher-placed team advances;
 Semi-finals: the higher-placed team plays at home for second leg. If teams are tied on aggregate, the higher-placed team advances;
 Final: the higher-placed team plays at home for second leg. If teams are tied on aggregate, the higher-placed team is promoted to Serie A, unless the teams finished tied on points after regular season, in which case winner is decided by extra-time and a penalty shootout if necessary.

Preliminary round

Semi-finals

First leg

Second leg

Final

First leg

Second leg

Relegation play-out
The higher-placed team plays at home for second leg. If teams are tied on aggregate, the lower-placed team is relegated to Serie C, unless the teams finished tied on points after regular season, in which case winner is decided by extra-time and a penalty shootout if necessary.

|}

First leg

Second leg

Season statistics

Top goalscorers

Note
1 Player scored 1 goal in the play-offs.
2 Player scored 2 goals in the play-offs.
5 Player scored 5 goals in the play-offs.

Top assists

Hat-tricks

Note
(H) – Home  (A) – Away

Clean sheets

Note
1 Player kept 1 clean sheet in the play-offs.
2 Player kept 2 clean sheets in the play-offs.

References

External links

 

Serie B seasons
Italy
1